History Is Made at Night is a 1937 American romantic comedy-drama film directed by Frank Borzage and starring Jean Arthur, Charles Boyer, and Colin Clive. Its plot follows a woman who falls in love with a Parisian waiter who saves her from a set-up her possessive ship magnate husband has hatched to keep her under his control.

The film has been noted by critics for its blending of genres, including comedy, drama, and romance, as well as introducing elements of suspense and disaster films in its final act.

Plot
Irene Vail decides to divorce her husband, the rich ship owner Bruce Vail, after he falsely accuses her of having an affair. Bitterly jealous and possessive of Irene, Bruce learns that he can prevent the divorce from being finalized if he can provide evidence that she has been involved with another man within six months of filing for divorce. Bruce pays his driver, Michael, to go to Irene's hotel room in Paris and pretend to be her lover, with the intention of having a private detective catch them in a compromising position. However, an unknown man overhears Irene's startled cry upon finding Michael in her room. A struggle ensues when the man defends Irene against Michael's unwanted advances, and ends with Michael on the floor, unconscious. When Bruce and the detective burst into the room, the man threatens them with a gun, demands Irene's jewelry, and takes Irene hostage.

Once they are away, the intruder, Paul Dumond, returns Irene's jewelry and invites her to dine with him at the Château Bleu restaurant, where he works as a waiter. They dance the night away and Irene falls madly in love with him. In the morning, Irene returns to find Vail and the police in her room, for Michael is dead. Vail leads her to believe that Paul is responsible for his death, and blackmails her into coming back to America with him in exchange for Paul's freedom. Distraught that he is unable to find Irene, Paul reads in the newspaper that Irene has reunited with her husband and left for America. Sensing something is wrong, he embarks for the United States to find her, accompanied by Cesare, his good friend and head chef of Château Bleu.

In Manhattan, Paul and Cesare rehabilitate a restaurant, with the hope that its reputation will cause Irene to come to dine. The reunion takes place at last, but the happiness is short-lived when Paul learns that Michael is dead and a man has been arrested in Paris for the murder. Unwilling to let an innocent man pay for what he thinks is his crime, Paul embarks for Paris, and Irene joins him. They travel on the liner Princess Irene, which is owned by Vail and named after her.

Vail learns they are on the ship. In a rage, he radios orders to the captain to run at full speed, despite the danger of collision with an iceberg in the poor weather conditions, supposedly to break the record for fastest crossing. He actually hopes the ship will be sunk, killing Paul and Irene. The ship does strike an iceberg, and premature news reports state that the ship has sunk with horrendous loss of life, with the death toll possibly higher than the Titanic disaster. Consumed by guilt, Vail commits suicide and confesses to killing Michael in a suicide note. Fortunately, the Princess Irene'''s bulkhead doors manage to contain the water and prevent the ship from sinking. Paul and Irene and the other passengers rejoice when they hear they are to be rescued.

Cast

Production
Director Frank Borzage's attachment to the project was announced in July 1936. Filming of History Is Made at Night began on November 4, 1936, and was completed on December 31, 1936.

ReleaseHistory Is Made at Night was released in New York City on March 27, 1937.

Box office
The film made a profit of $17,450.

Critical response
Dan Callahan of Slant Magazine notes the film as a "patchwork quilt genre bender that stands as one of Frank Borzage's supreme achievements."

The film was nominated for the American Film Institute's 2002 list AFI's 100 Years...100 Passions.

Home mediaHistory Is Made at Night'' was released on VHS by Warner Home Video in 1993, and was scantly available on home media until it was released on Blu-ray and DVD by the Criterion Collection on April 13, 2021.

References

Sources

External links
 
 
 
 Dave Kehr at Chicago Reader
History Is Made at Night: Taking a Chance on Love an essay by Dan Callahan at the Criterion Collection

1937 films
1937 comedy films
1937 drama films
1930s romantic comedy-drama films
American black-and-white films
American romantic comedy-drama films
Films directed by Frank Borzage
Films produced by Walter Wanger
Films set in Manhattan
Films set in Paris
Films set on ships
United Artists films
1930s English-language films
1930s American films